Little San Pascual Mountain is a summit in Socorro County, New Mexico.

References 

Mountains of Socorro County, New Mexico
Mountains of New Mexico